is the first compilation album by Japanese idol duo Wink, released by Polystar on November 1, 1990. It covers the duo's singles from 1988 to 1990 and features a remix medley as the final track. A limited edition release included an 8 cm mini disc with two bonus tracks.

The album peaked at No. 5 on Oricon's albums chart and sold over 203,000 copies. It was also certified Gold by the RIAJ.

Track listing

Charts

Certification

References

External links 
 
 

1990 compilation albums
Wink (duo) compilation albums
Japanese-language compilation albums